This is a list of Humboldt State Lumberjacks football players in the NFL Draft.

Key

Selections

References

Humboldt State

Humboldt State Lumberjacks NFL Draft